A distributor  is an electric and mechanical device used in the ignition system of older spark ignition engines. The distributor's main function is to route electricity from the ignition coil to each spark plug at the correct time.

Design 

A distributor consists of a rotating arm ('rotor') that is attached to the top of a rotating 'distributor shaft'. The rotor constantly receives high-voltage electricity from an ignition coil via brushes at the centre of the rotor. As the rotor spins, its tip passes close to (but does not touch) the output contacts for each cylinder. As the electrified tip passes each output contact, the high-voltage electricity is able to 'jump' across the small gap. This burst of electricity then travels to the spark plug (via high tension leads), where it ignites the air-fuel mixture in the combustion chamber.

On most overhead valve engines, the distributor shaft is driven by a gear on the camshaft; on most overhead camshaft engines, the distributor shaft is attached directly to a camshaft. 

Older distributor designs used a cam on the distributor shaft that operates the contact breaker (also called points). Opening the points causes a high induction voltage in the ignition coil. This design was superseded by an electronically-controlled ignition coil with a sensor (usually Hall effect or optical) to control the timing of the ignition coil charging.

Ignition advance 
In older distributors, adjusting the ignition timing is usually achieved through both mechanical advance and vacuum advance. Mechanical advance adjusts the timing based on the engine speed (rpm), using a set of hinged weights attached to the distributor shaft. These weights cause the breaker points mounting plate to slightly rotate, thereby advancing the ignition timing. Vacuum advance typically uses manifold vacuum the adjust the ignition timing, for example to improve fuel economy and driveability when minimal power is required from the engine.

Most distributors used on electronic fuel injection engines use electronics to adjust the ignition timing, instead of vacuum and centrifugal systems. This allows the ignition timing to be optimised based on factors other than engine speed and manifold vacuum.

Gallery

History 
The first mass-produced electric ignition was the Delco ignition system, which was introduced in the 1910 Cadillac Model 30. In the 1920s, Arthur Atwater Kent Sr invented the competingUnisparker ignition system.

By the end of the 20th century, distributors had been largely replaced by electronic ignition systems.

References 

Electric power distribution
Engine components
Ignition systems